Profile II: The Best of Emmylou Harris is a compilation of hits by Emmylou Harris originally from five of her albums released between 1979 and 1983 (Blue Kentucky Girl, Roses in the Snow, Cimarron, Last Date, and White Shoes), plus two singles, "Mister Sandman" from 1981, and "Someone Like You", a new tune which became a Billboard #26 country hit in early 1985. "Mister Sandman" is a different recording from the one which appeared on Harris's 1981 Evangeline album, and lacks the backup vocals of Dolly Parton and Linda Ronstadt featured on Evangeline.

Unlike her prior compilation, which collected all of her singles and two album tracks, Profile II omits several singles released during this period, including her duet with Roy Orbison, "That Lovin' You Feelin' Again" (from the Roadie soundtrack), "The Boxer" (from Roses in the Snow), "I Don't Have To Crawl" (from Evangeline), "If I Needed You" and "Tennessee Rose" (from Cimarron), "So Sad (To Watch Good Love Go Bad)" (from Last Date), and "In My Dreams" and "Drivin' Wheel" (from White Shoes).

Track listing

Chart performance

References

Emmylou Harris compilation albums
1984 compilation albums
Albums produced by Brian Ahern (producer)
Warner Records compilation albums